Triarius was a Gothic nobleman and soldier.

Triarius may also refer to:
 Triarius (tree), an 86.5-metre-high swamp gum Eucalyptus regnans in Tasmania
 Triarius (beetle) is a genus of skeletonizing leaf beetles in the family Chrysomelidae
 Triarii, elements of early Roman military legions, consisting of wealthy and older man